WJOY (1230 kHz) is a commercial AM radio station broadcasting an adult standards/soft adult contemporary format. Licensed to Burlington, Vermont, the station is owned by Hall Communications, Inc. WJOY carries the nationally syndicated music service "America's Best Music" provided by Westwood One.

History
The Vermont Broadcasting Corporation was formed in late 1945 and obtained a construction permit from the Federal Communications Commission for a new radio station to serve Burlington on 1230 kHz on February 6, 1946. The station took the call letters and began broadcasting as WJOY on September 14, 1946; the outlet originated from two studios—one on College Street downtown and another on Main Street—and was affiliated with ABC.

In 1961, WJOY was approved for its first technical upgrade in station history, from 250 to 1,000 watts. It heralded the start of a busy decade for the station that included its first expansion. The next year, WJOY started WJOY-FM 98.9, which was the state's first commercial FM radio station.

The original College Street studios were on land leased to the Vermont Broadcasting Corporation by the University of Vermont. In 1966, the university desired to reclaim the land and build student housing on the property. As a result, WJOY built new custom studios on a piece of property in South Burlington; the transmitter was relocated, too, using a new  tower to replace the  tower that had previously been in service.

In 1971, Frank Balch, who had joined WJOY as an announcer in 1951 and had become president of the Vermont Broadcasting Corporation, acquired majority control of WJOY-AM-FM. After 35 years in broadcasting, Balch sold WJOY and the FM, now known as WQCR, to Hall Communications of Norwich, Connecticut, for $2.2 million in 1983; by the time of the Hall purchase, WJOY was already airing a nostalgia format.

References

External links
WJOY History Page

JOY
Radio stations established in 1946
1946 establishments in Vermont